Tây Thành was the former 32nd province of Nguyễn Vietnam that encompassed the region what is present-day Cambodia. Its capital was the Cambodian capital of Phnom Penh (known to the Vietnamese as "Nam Vang"). It was a special province with a dual system, consisting of Cambodian monarchs who reign as puppet rulers while a Vietnamese governor resided in Phnom Penh. The province was finally abolished in 1847 after peace talks between Thailand and Vietnam concluded a dual-suzerainty over Cambodia.

Chronology
In 1834 the vassal king of Cambodia, Ang Chan II, was escorted back to Cambodia by Vietnamese troops following Siamese–Vietnamese War (1831–1834). The Tây Thành province was formed in late 1834 after Vietnamese emperor Minh Mạng's edict that appointed General and the Resident-Superior of Cambodia Trương Minh Giảng as the General-governor of Tay Thanh province. Cambodian queen Ang Mey, princess of king Chan, was crowned as de jure ruler of Cambodia in early 1835 with a Vietnamese-style ceremony. From 1835 to 1840, Minh Mạng began conducting the progress of what historians called The Vietnamization of Cambodia in order of assimilating the Cambodians into Vietnamese cultural sphere and Vietnamese ethnicity.

Fruitless with the slowness of his program, in June 1840 Minh Mạng demoted Mey and the other princesses. In August 1841 they were all arrested and deported to Vietnam along with the royal regalia. Spurred by the death of Princess Ang Baen and the absence of their Queen Ang Mey, many Cambodian courtiers and their followers revolted against the Vietnamese rule. The death of Minh Mang in 1841 changed the situation. Vietnamese offices and soldiers in Tây Thành province were tearing down by Cambodian guerillas while the governor Trương Minh Giảng had been calling back by the newly crowned emperor Thieu Tri to deal with internal rebellions.  After a failed attempt to bring Prince Im to Cambodian throne in late 1841, Trương Minh Giảng committed suicide. 

The Siamese launched their offensive in late 1841 and took Phnom Penh with ease, but had to withdraw in 1844 to Udong. After having suppressed internal rebellions, the Vietnamese counterattacked and placed Queen Ang Mey back to the throne in 1845. After reached a peace agreement with Siam, in June 1847 the Vietnamese court released all royal members of the Cambodian ruling family, transferred the government to the new independent Cambodian monarchy of king Ang Duong and withdrew their army from Cambodia, ending the Tây Thành province.

Districts

Notes

References 

 
 

 

Provinces of Vietnam
19th century in Cambodia